RMH can refer to:

 Response modulation hypothesis, suggesting that psychopathy is an attention disorder  
 Royal Melbourne Hospital, Australia
 Riyadh Military Hospital, Saudi Arabia
 Ronald McDonald House, place to stay for families with hospitalized children
 Roh Moo-Hyun, the former president of South Korea (9/1/1946 - 5/23/2009)